César Barros may refer to:
 César Barros (fencer)
 César Barros (motorcyclist)